Martti Johannes Häikiö (b. 1 October 1949 in Mikkeli), is a Finnish historian and writer. In 1978 Häikiö became an associate professor in political history at Helsinki University. He has also been editor in chief and columnist in many journals and newspapers.

His doctoral dissertation concerns the British politics on Finland before and during the Winter War and has thereafter published a lot of popular works on modern Finnish history and corporate history, such as Nokia, the inside story (2002).

References 
 Uppslagsverket Finland, 2 (2004)

External links 

Academic staff of the University of Helsinki
1949 births
Living people
21st-century Finnish historians